The Thirteen Attributes of Mercy (י״ג מִידּוֹת) or Shelosh-'Esreh Middot HaRakhamim (transliterated from the Hebrew) as enumerated in the Book of Exodus in Parasha Ki Tissa are the Divine Attributes with which, according to Judaism, God governs the world.

According to the explanation of Maimonides these attributes must not be regarded as qualities inherent in God, but as the method of His activity, by which the divine governance appears to the human observer to be controlled. In the Sifre, however, these attributes are not called , which may mean "quality" as well as "rule" and "measure", but "derakhim" (ways), since they are the ways of God which Moses prayed to know and which God proclaimed to him.

The thirteen attributes are alluded to a number of other times in the Bible.

Division
The number thirteen is adopted from Talmudic and rabbinic tradition. There are divergent opinions as to with which word they begin and with which they conclude. According to some, the Thirteen Attributes begin with the first "Adonai", in verse 6, and end with the word "ve-nakeh" in verse 7. The single attributes are contained in the verses as follows:

  YHVH: compassion before a person sins;
  YHVH: compassion after a person has sinned;
  El: mighty in compassion to give all creatures according to their need;
  Raḥum: merciful, that humankind may not be distressed;
  VeḤanun: and gracious if humankind is already in distress;
  Erekh appayim: slow to anger;
  VeRav ḥesed: and plenteous in kindness;
  VeEmet: and truth;
  Notzer ḥesed laalafim: keeping kindness unto thousands.
  Noseh avon: forgiving iniquity;
  VaFeshah: and transgression;
  VeḤata'ah: and sin;
  VeNakeh: and pardoning.

Others term  a single , the thirteenth being, in their opinion,  (visiting the iniquity of the fathers upon the children), "this being regarded as compassionate since the transgressor is not punished immediately".

Liturgical usage
The general usage is that the various recitations of the thirteen  begin with the first "Adonai" and conclude with "ve-nakeh".

They must not be recited by only one person in prayer, but by an entire congregation, which must consist of at least ten persons, a minyan.

 According to Lurianic Kabbalah, they are recited on holidays which do not fall on the sabbath when the Sefer Torah is taken from the Ark.  In some Western Ashkenazic communities, they never accepted this custom, or accepted it only on the High Holidays and not of Pilgrimage Festivals.
 In Ashkenazi synagogues, it is also customary that on the fast days on which Exodus 32:11–14 and 34:1–10 are read, the reader stops at the word "Vayikra" in order that the congregation may recite the thirteen attributes, after which he continues his reading.
 The Thirteen Attributes are recited many times in Selichot prayers. After every petition the thirteen middot are recited with their introductory prayer, the well-known El Melech yoshev, which runs as follows: "Almighty King, sittest on the throne of mercy, showing forth Thy compassion, and forgiving the sins of Thy people by ever taking away their former guilt, ofttimes granting pardon unto sinners and forgiveness to the transgressors, making manifest Thy goodness both to body and to soul, nor punishing them according to their iniquity; Almighty One, as Thou hast taught us to recite the thirteen [middot], so remember now the thirteenfold covenant, as Thou didst in former days proclaim it to the modest one [Moses], even as it is written..." (then follow the verses Exodus 34:5–7a and 9b).  In addition, two selichot: "Shelosh esreh middot" pizmon Ezkera Elohim of Amittai b. Shephatiah are about the attributes.
 In some communities, particularly those influenced by Lurianic Kabbalah, they are recited before every recitation of Taḥanun.

See also
 Attributes of God in Christianity
 Chesed
 Thirteen Principles of Faith
 Thirteen Rules of Rabbi Ishmael

References

 

High Holy Days
Jewish prayer and ritual texts
Jewish theology
Ten Days of Repentance